Nelly Kim Furtado  (born December 2, 1978) is a Canadian singer and songwriter. Furtado has sold over 40 million records worldwide making her one of the most successful Canadian artists. She is widely known for her musical versatility and genre experimentation.

She first gained fame with her trip hop-inspired debut album, Whoa, Nelly! (2000), which was a critical and commercial success that spawned two top-10 singles on the Billboard Hot 100, "I'm Like a Bird" and "Turn Off the Light". The first of the two singles won her a Grammy Award for Best Female Pop Vocal Performance. Furtado's introspective folk-heavy 2003 second album, Folklore, explored her Portuguese roots. Its singles received moderate success in Europe, but the album's underperformance compared to her debut was regarded as a sophomore slump.

Furtado's third album, Loose (2006), was a smash hit and became her bestselling album, with more than 10 million copies sold worldwide, also making it one of the bestselling albums of the 2000s. Considered a radical image reinvention, Furtado continued to explore her Portuguese heritage while leaning heavier into hip hop. The album spawned four successful number-one singles worldwide; "Promiscuous", "Maneater", "Say It Right", and "All Good Things (Come to an End)". Her Timbaland collaboration "Give It to Me" (2007) in the same era also topped the charts in the US and overseas. Furtado's critically acclaimed duet with James Morrison, "Broken Strings", also topped the charts in Europe in 2008.

She released her first Spanish-language album, Mi Plan, in 2009, which won her a Latin Grammy Award for Best Female Pop Vocal Album. In 2012, Furtado released her nostalgia-inspired fifth album The Spirit Indestructible. Furtado split with her management and went independent thereafter, releasing her indie-pop sixth album, The Ride, in 2017 under her own label Nelstar Entertainment.

She has won many awards throughout her career, including one Grammy Award from seven nominations, one Latin Grammy Award, ten Juno Awards, one BRIT Award, one Billboard Music Award, one MTV Europe Music Award, one World Music Award, and three Much Music Video Awards. Furtado has a star on Canada's Walk of Fame, and was awarded Commander of the Order of Prince Henry on February 28, 2014, by Aníbal Cavaco Silva, the then-President of Portugal.

Early life 
Furtado was born on December 2, 1978, in Victoria, British Columbia, Canada. Her Portuguese parents, António José Furtado and Maria Manuela Furtado, were born on São Miguel Island in the Azores and had immigrated to Canada in the late 1960s. Nelly was named after Soviet gymnast Nellie Kim. Her siblings are Michael Anthony and Lisa Anne. They were raised Roman Catholic. At age four, she began performing and singing in Portuguese. Furtado's first public performance was when she sang a duet with her mother at a church on Portugal Day. She began playing musical instruments at the age of nine, learning the trombone, ukulele and, in later years, the guitar and keyboards. At the age of 12, she began writing songs, and as a teenager, she performed in a Portuguese marching band. Furtado has acknowledged her family as the source of her strong work ethic; she spent eight summers working as a chambermaid with her mother, along with her brother and sister, who was a housekeeper in Victoria.

Career

1996–1999: Career beginnings 
After graduating from Mount Douglas Secondary School in 1996, she moved to Toronto to reside with her sister. There, she got a full-time job at an alarm company. Later, she would meet Tallis Newkirk, member of the hip hop group Plains of Fascination. She contributed vocals to their 1996 album, Join the Ranks, on the track "Waitin' 4 the Streets". The following year, she formed Nelstar, a trip hop duo with Newkirk. Ultimately, Furtado felt the trip hop style of the duo was "too segregated", and believed it did not represent her personality or allow her to showcase her vocal ability. She left the group and planned to move back home.

In 1997, she performed at the Honey Jam talent show. Her performance attracted the attention of The Philosopher Kings singer Gerald Eaton, who then approached her to write with him. He and fellow Kings member Brian West helped Furtado produce a demo. She left Toronto, but returned again to record more material with Eaton and West. The material recorded during these sessions was shopped to record companies by her attorney Chris Taylor and led to her 1999 record deal with DreamWorks Records, signed by A&R executive Beth Halper, partner of Garbage drummer and record producer Butch Vig. Furtado's first single, "Party's Just Begun (Again)", was released that year on the soundtrack album for Brokedown Palace (1999).

2000–2005: Whoa, Nelly! and Folklore 
Furtado continued the collaboration with Eaton and West, who co-produced her debut album, Whoa, Nelly!, which was released in October 2000. The album was an international success, supported by three international singles: "I'm Like a Bird", "Turn Off the Light", and "...On the Radio (Remember the Days)". It received four Grammy nominations in 2002, and her debut single won for Best Female Pop Vocal Performance. Furtado's work was also critically acclaimed for her innovative mixture of various genres and sounds. Slant Magazine called the album "a delightful and refreshing antidote to the army of 'pop princesses' and rap-metal bands that had taken over popular music at the turn of the millennium". The sound of the album was strongly influenced by musicians who had traversed cultures and "the challenge of making heartfelt, emotional music that's upbeat and hopeful". According to Maclean's magazine, Whoa, Nelly! had sold six million copies worldwide as of August 2006. Portions of the song "Scared of You" are in Portuguese, while "Onde Estás" is entirely in Portuguese, reflecting Furtado's Portuguese heritage. Following the release of the album, Furtado headlined the "Burn in the Spotlight Tour" and also appeared on Moby's Area:One tour.

In 2002, Furtado appeared on the song "Thin Line", on underground hip hop group Jurassic 5's album Power in Numbers. The same year, Furtado provided her vocals to the Paul Oakenfold song "The Harder They Come" from the album Bunkka. She also had a collaboration with Colombian artist Juanes in the song "Fotografía" (Photograph), where she showed her diversity of yet another language, Spanish. Furtado was also featured in "Breath" from Swollen Members' Monsters in the Closet release; the video for "Breath", directed by Spawn creator Todd McFarlane, won the 2003 Western Canadian Music Awards Outstanding Video and MuchVIBE Best Rap Video. In 2002, Furtado was the recipient of an International Achievement Award at the SOCAN Awards in Toronto for her song "I'm Like a Bird".

Furtado's second album, Folklore, was released in November 2003. One of the tracks on the album, "Childhood Dreams", was dedicated to her daughter, Nevis. The album includes the single "Força", the official anthem of the UEFA Euro 2004. Furtado performed the song in Lisbon in the final of the tournament, in which Portugal national team played. The lead single released was "Powerless (Say What You Want)" and the second single was the ballad "Try". The album was not as successful as her debut, partly due to the album's less "poppy" sound, as well as underpromotion from her label DreamWorks Records. DreamWorks had just been sold to Universal Music Group at the time of the album's release. Eventually in 2005, DreamWorks Records, along with many of its artists, including Furtado, were absorbed into Geffen Records. "Powerless (Say What You Want)" was later remixed into a Spanish version called "Abre Tu Corazón", featuring Juanes, who had previously worked with Furtado on his track "Fotografía". The two would collaborate again on "Te Busqué" (I Searched for You), a single from Furtado's 2006 album Loose. In 2003, Furtado won an International Achievement Award at the SOCAN Awards in Toronto for her song "Turn Off the Light".

2006–2008: Loose 

Furtado's third album, named Loose, after the spontaneous, creative decisions she made while creating the album, was released in June 2006. In this album, primarily produced by Timbaland, Furtado experiments with sounds from R&B, hip hop, and 1980s music. Furtado herself describes the album's sound as punk-hop, described as "modern, poppy, spooky" and as having "a mysterious, after-midnight vibe... extremely visceral". She attributed the youthful sound of the album to the presence of her two-year-old daughter. The album received generally positive reviews from critics, with some citing the "revitalising" effect of Timbaland on Furtado's music, and others calling it "slick, smart and surprising".

Loose has become the most successful album of Furtado's career so far, as it reached number one, not only in Canada and the United States, but also several countries worldwide. The album produced her first number-one hit in the United States, "Promiscuous", as well as her first number-one hit in the United Kingdom, "Maneater". The single "Say It Right" eventually became Furtado's most successful song worldwide, due to its huge success in Europe and in the United States, where it became her second number-one hit. "All Good Things (Come to an End)" became her most successful song in Europe, topping single charts in numerous countries there. On February 16, 2007, Furtado embarked on the "Get Loose Tour". She returned in March 2007 to her hometown of Victoria to perform a concert at the Save-On Foods Memorial Centre. In honour of her visit, local leaders officially proclaimed March 21, 2007, the first day of spring, as Nelly Furtado Day. After the tour, she released her first live DVD/CD named Loose the Concert. On April 1, 2007, Furtado was a performer and host of the 2007 Juno Awards in Saskatoon, Saskatchewan. She won all five awards for which she was nominated, including Album of the Year and Single of the Year. She also appeared on stage at the Concert for Diana at Wembley Stadium in London on July 1, 2007, where she performed "Say It Right", "Maneater", and "I'm Like a Bird".

In 2007, Furtado and Justin Timberlake were featured on Timbaland's single "Give It to Me", which became her third number-one single in the U.S. and second in the UK. In late 2008, Furtado collaborated with James Morrison on a song called "Broken Strings" for his album Songs for You, Truths for Me. The single was released on December 8 and peaked at No. 2 on the UK Singles Chart in early January. In 2008, she sang with the Italian group Zero Assoluto the ballad "Win or Lose – Appena prima di partire", released in Italy, France and Germany and whose video was shot in Barcelona. Furtado made a guest appearance on the song "Jump" by Flo Rida from his album R.O.O.T.S., and also made a guest appearance on Divine Brown's Love Chronicles, co-writing and singing on the background of the song "Sunglasses". Furtado married Cuban sound engineer Demacio "Demo" Castellón, with whom she had worked on the Loose album, on July 19, 2008.

2009–2011: Mi Plan and The Best of Nelly Furtado 

Furtado's debut Spanish album, Mi Plan was released with the first single, "Manos Al Aire" ("Hands in the Air"). She had formed her own record label, Nelstar, in conjunction with Canadian independent label group Last Gang Labels. The first act signed to Nelstar is Fritz Helder & the Phantoms. "Manos al Aire" was released on the new label. The second, third and fourth singles were "Más", "Mi Plan" and "Bajo Otra Luz" respectively. Furtado won the Latin Grammy Award for Best Female Pop Vocal Album for Mi Plan. She is the first Portuguese-Canadian to win a Latin Grammy award. Lifestyle, her planned fourth English studio album, was not released during the summer of 2010 in favor a second leg of her Mi Plan Tour. To promote the tour in Brazil, on March 24, 2010, Furtado made a "VIP Pocket Show" in reality show program Big Brother Brasil 10 from Rede Globo, the country's leading channel. Furtado participated in the live DVD recording of the Brazilian singer Ivete Sangalo in Madison Square Garden on September 4, 2010.

Furtado released Mi Plan Remixes featuring 12 tracks of remixed hits from Mi Plan. This album included the Original Spanglish Version of "Fuerte", her final release from Mi Plan. Furtado made a guest appearance on Canadian singer k-os's new album Yes!, collaborating alongside Saukrates on the song "I Wish I Knew Natalie Portman", released in early July 2009. Nelly Furtado also made a guest appearance on Tiësto's single "Who Wants to Be Alone" on his new album Kaleidoscope. Furtado sang in a duet with Bryan Adams at the opening ceremonies of the 2010 Vancouver Winter Olympic Games. The song was called "Bang the Drum" released on EMI album Sounds Of Vancouver 2010 (a commemorative album). Furtado was featured in a new song by N.E.R.D called "Hot-n-Fun". She also participated in the Young Artists for Haiti song, in which many Canadian artists came together and sang K'naan's song "Wavin' Flag" to raise money for the victims of the Haiti earthquake. Furtado was honoured with a star on Canada's Walk of Fame in October 2010.

Furtado released her first greatest hits album titled The Best of Nelly Furtado on November 16, 2010. Three new songs were included on the greatest hits album, including "Night Is Young", "Girlfriend in the City", and the Lester Mendez produced track, left over from the Loose sessions, "Stars". The album's first single, "Night Is Young", was released on October 12, 2010. Furtado had previously sung two of the new songs: "Girlfriend in the City" and "Night Is Young" at her concert in Warsaw, Poland.
Furtado came under fire after 2011 reports from the New York Times and a WikiLeaks document revealed she had accepted payment of one million dollars to perform for the family of Libyan ruler Muammar Gaddafi. Only after the story broke did she promise to donate to charity the CDN$1 million she received for a 2007 concert, which ended up going to Free the Children. Furtado publicly endorsed Green Party leader Elizabeth May in Saanich-Gulf Islands during the federal election in 2011. Furtado was featured on one of the Game's The R.E.D. Album tracks, titled "Mamma Knows" (produced by The Neptunes). For the Canadian film The Year Dolly Parton Was My Mom, Furtado lent her vocals for the Dolly Parton gospel cover "The Seeker" featured during the credits of the film.

2012–2013: The Spirit Indestructible 

Furtado collaborated with recording artist Alex Cuba and K'naan again. The duet with K'naan, "Is Anybody Out There", was released as the first single from his extended play More Beautiful than Silence. The song topped the charts in New Zealand and was successful in European territories as well as her native Canada. It also charted on the Billboard Hot 100. The Spirit Indestructible was released in September 2012. Furtado previously proclaimed that the album was most like her 2000 debut Whoa, Nelly!, but containing elements from urban, alternative, and reggae. The influences for the album range from Janelle Monáe, The xx, to Florence + the Machine. The album had input from producers such as The Neptunes, Tiësto, Timbaland, Rick Nowels, Ryan Tedder and Rodney Jerkins.

The first single from The Spirit Indestructible, "Big Hoops (Bigger the Better)", was released digitally on April 17, 2012 and was sent to North American radio stations on May 1, 2012. The song was commercially successful in the United Kingdom, Belgium and the Netherlands, but underperformed in other territories. The second single and title track performed well in Germany and Slovakia and charted in Japan, peaking at number 79 on the Hot 100. Other singles, "Parking Lot" and "Waiting for the Night", charted in Canada and several European territories.

Furtado continued to collaborate with hip-hop producer Salaam Remi, who previously worked on the 2010 single "Night Is Young", on "The Edge". The lyrics for the Salaam Remi produced track are reported to be influenced by the Tiger Woods cheating scandal, in which was originally referred to as "Elin's Song". Furtado promoted the album on her The Spirit Indestructible Tour.

2015–2019: Independence and The Ride 
In February 2015, Furtado co-headlined Switzerlands Art on Ice tour with Tom Odell.

In 2016, Furtado appeared in a minor supporting role in the romantic comedy film A Date with Miss Fortune.

On February 14, 2016, Furtado performed the Canadian national anthem at the 2016 NBA All-Star Game which was held in Toronto (this was the second time Furtado had performed at the NBA All-Star Game, also having performed "O Canada" at the 2004 NBA All-Star Game). That same month, she also began teasing new music via social media, suggesting that the album would have a connection to Dallas, Texas, where much of the album was recorded. In 2016, Furtado collaborated with Dev Hynes on the track "Hadron Collider". The track appears on Hynes' album Freetown Sound.

In July 2016, Furtado released "Behind Your Back" exclusively on Spotify, describing the song as an "appetiser" for her next album. Following the release, in an interview with CBC Player, Furtado stated that her album is finished and she has recorded 16 songs with John Congleton, but the album will contain 12. On September 8, 2016, Furtado confirmed the title of the upcoming album, The Ride, which was released in March 2017. During the interview she also confirmed a new track off the album titled "Islands of Me", which was released on streaming services on September 10, 2016. The album's first released song "Pipe Dreams" was released to SoundCloud on November 8, 2016, with the release accompanied by a short teaser video of the album on YouTube. The cover song "Sticks & Stones" from her album was re-made by Metro with newly recorded vocals by Furtado in May 2018. It later reached number one on the Billboard Dance Club Songs chart. The official remixes include StoneBridge, Bimbo Jones, Manuel Riva & Cristian Poow.

2020-present: Reissues and return to music 
In October 2020, Furtado celebrated the 20th anniversary of her debut studio album, Whoa, Nelly! by releasing an expanded edition of 22 tracks to digital and streaming platforms.

In May 2021, Furtado collaborated with German duo Quarterhead on a remix of her song All Good Things (Come to an End). In June 2021, Furtado celebrated the 15th anniversary of her third studio album Loose by releasing an expanded edition of 32 tracks to digital and streaming platforms.

In July 2022, after a five-year performing hiatus, Furtado joined Drake on stage for the latter's October World Weekend concert in Toronto, where they performed "Promiscuous" and "I'm Like a Bird". Furtado also has reported being working on new music via her Instagram stories. 

On 31 December 2022, five years after her last concert in Baloise Session in Basel, Switzerland, Furtado performed live at the Beyond The Valley Festival in Australia.

Other ventures 
Furtado has appeared on the cover of numerous international fashion magazines, including Canada's Flare and Elle; Russia's Elle Girl; Hungary's Shape; Portugal's Vogue; Germany's Maxim; and US' Teen People, Vanidades and YM. She has appeared on the cover of several international editions of Cosmopolitan (Turkey, Italy, Lithuania, Poland, Serbia and Hungary). She was voted one of the "Fun and Fearless Females" by Cosmopolitan in 2002.

Personal life 
In the 2000s, Furtado gave birth to a daughter with her then boyfriend Jasper Gahunia. They dated for several years and were friends prior. The couple broke up in 2005, though according to Furtado in a 2006 interview, remain friends and share joint responsibility of raising their daughter. On July 19, 2008, Furtado married sound engineer Demacio Castellon, with whom she had worked on Loose. In April 2017, during an appearance on the British daytime panel show Loose Women, Furtado announced she had separated from Castellon during the summer of 2016 and said she is now single. In December 2021, Furtado revealed on her Instagram account that she has two more children.

In a June 2006 interview with Genre magazine, when asked if she had "ever felt an attraction to women", Furtado replied, "Absolutely. Women are beautiful and sexy". Some considered this an announcement of bisexuality but, in August 2006, she stated that she was "straight, but very open-minded".

In November 2006, Furtado revealed that she once turned down US$500,000 to pose fully clothed in Playboy. Furtado can speak fifty to sixty percent of the Spanish language.

As of March 2017, Furtado has stated that she resides in Toronto and New York City. In an April 2017 interview with DIY magazine, Furtado revealed she had purchased an apartment in New York City.

Philanthropy 

Furtado hosted a program about AIDS on MTV, which also featured guests Justin Timberlake and Alicia Keys. On September 27, 2011, Furtado announced during Free the Children's We Day, that she was giving CDN$1,000,000 to Free the Children's effort to build girls' schools in the Maasai region of Kenya.

Furtado is a member of the Canadian charity Artists Against Racism.

Artistry 
Furtado possesses a mezzo-soprano voice. Kristie Rohwedder of Bustle Magazine characterizes it as "soaring" while Sal Cinquemani of Slant Magazine calls it "nasally". During her childhood and youth, Furtado embraced many musical genres, listening heavily to mainstream R&B, hip hop, alternative hip hop, drum and bass, trip hop, world music (including Portuguese fado, Brazilian bossa nova and Indian music), and a variety of others. Her biggest influence when growing up was Ani DiFranco, she explained that "[w]hen I was a teenager, I wanted to be Ani DiFranco. I never wanted to be part of corporate music." She cites diverse influences, including Madonna, Mariah Carey, Blondie, Prince, The Police, Eurythmics, Talking Heads, De La Soul, TLC, Nusrat Fateh Ali Khan, Amália Rodrigues, Caetano Veloso, Juanes, Jeff Buckley, Esthero, Björk, Cornershop, Oasis, Radiohead, The Smashing Pumpkins, U2 and Beck. 

Furtado's work has also inspired the likes of Lorde, Slayyyter, Dua Lipa, Bridgit Mendler and Gia Woods.

Discography 

 Whoa, Nelly! (2000)
 Folklore (2003)
 Loose (2006)
 Mi Plan (2009)
 The Spirit Indestructible (2012)
 The Ride (2017)

Tours 

Headlining

 Burn in the Spotlight Tour (2001–02)
 Come as You Are Tour (2004)
 Get Loose Tour (2007–08)
 Mi Plan Tour (2010)
 The Spirit Indestructible Tour (2013)
 Summer Tour (2017)

Co-headlining
 Area Festival (2001) 
 Art on Ice (2015)

Opening act
 Elevation Tour (for U2) (2001)

Filmography

See also

 List of awards and nominations received by Nelly Furtado

References

External links

 
 Nelly Furtado on Spotify
 
 
 
 

 
1978 births
20th-century Canadian women singers
21st-century Canadian actresses
21st-century Canadian women singers
Actresses from Victoria, British Columbia
Brit Award winners
Canadian contemporary R&B singers
Canadian expatriate musicians in the United States
Canadian women hip hop musicians
Canadian women pop singers
Canadian women singer-songwriters
Canadian folk guitarists
Canadian folk singers
Canadian folk singer-songwriters
Canadian folk-pop singers
Canadian hip hop singers
Canadian multi-instrumentalists
Canadian people of Azorean descent
Canadian people of Portuguese descent
Canadian philanthropists
Canadian pop guitarists
Canadian women folk guitarists
Canadian women guitarists
Commanders of the Order of Prince Henry
Echo (music award) winners
Fellows of the Royal Conservatory of Music
Geffen Records artists
Grammy Award winners
Interscope Records artists
Jack Richardson Producer of the Year Award winners
Juno Award for Album of the Year winners
Juno Award for Artist of the Year winners
Juno Award for Breakthrough Artist of the Year winners
Juno Award for Pop Album of the Year winners
Juno Award for Single of the Year winners
Juno Award for Songwriter of the Year winners
Juno Fan Choice Award winners
Latin Grammy Award winners
Living people
MTV Europe Music Award winners
Musicians from Victoria, British Columbia
Spanish-language singers of Canada
Trip hop musicians
Women in Latin music
World Music Awards winners
20th-century Portuguese women singers
21st-century Portuguese women singers
21st-century Portuguese actresses
Portuguese hip hop musicians
Portuguese pop singers
Portuguese women singer-songwriters
Portuguese folk singers
Portuguese guitarists
Portuguese multi-instrumentalists